Lucky Stiff is a 1988 American black comedy film written by Pat Proft and directed by Anthony Perkins. It is his only directing credit apart from Psycho III.

Plot
Ron Douglas takes a vacation in the mountains to seek solace from his bride abandoning him on their wedding day. There he meets Cynthia Mitchell, who invites him home for Christmas dinner with her family, cannibalistic descendants of the Donner Party. He unexpectedly encounters his ex-fiancée, who is engaged to one of Cynthia's relatives. He also discovers that he is going to be killed and eaten by Cynthia's family. He manages to successfully escape with his ex-fiancée and she agrees to go through with the wedding.

Cast
 Donna Dixon as Cynthia Mitchell
 Joe Alaskey as Ron Douglas
 Jeff Kober as Ike
 Fran Ryan as Ma
 William Morgan Sheppard as Pa
 Barbara Howard as Frances
 Leigh McCloskey as Eric West
 Elizabeth Arlen as Arlene
 Charles Frank as Durel
 Andy Wood as Futterman
 Bill Quinn as Emmet Kassler
 David Smith as Roman Kassler
 Joe Unger as Kirby
 Dustin "Beluga" DeMont as the 3rd grade stuntman double

Production
Filming took place in Truckee, California.

Release
The film was released in the United States in November 1988, followed by Australia on December 7, 1989, France on February 21, 1990, and Portugal on March 15, 1991. While a box office failure, the film developed a cult following due to its quotable dialogue and exposure in Fangoria, who did a feature on the film.

References

External links

1988 films
American black comedy films
1980s black comedy films
Films directed by Anthony Perkins
Films scored by Michael Tavera
New Line Cinema films
Films with screenplays by Pat Proft
1988 comedy films
1980s English-language films
1980s American films